Chanel Cole (born Chanel Cole Whalley on 13 November 1977) is an Australian musician, best known as a member of the Australian trip hop group Spook.

Chanel was born in Hamilton, New Zealand, and moved to Bega, New South Wales. Her fame grew largely from her appearance as a contestant in the second season of Australian Idol (2004). She was eliminated from the competition on 25 October having reached fifth place. Both her song choices and jazz-influenced vocal style were noted as setting her apart from the other Idol hopefuls, along with her eccentric hair accessories, which often included feathers, flowers and other ornaments.

Discography

Albums
 Australian Idol: The Final 10 (17 January 2005)
 The Dusk Sessions (4 October 2005)

Singles
 Good Times (24 January 2005)

Bootlegs
 Cracked But Intact – Colestock 2005 [Live] (November 2005)

Podcasts
 Insatiable Banalities Podcast #99 – The Podcast, a joint Culturazi/RiotACT production [Live] (Recorded 17 November 2008, First filed 25 November 2008, Uploaded 26 November 2008). Interviews/discussions and songs.
Track list:
•Counting the Cost. 4:59
•Cheese (Pete Lyon). 18:03
•The Bullet and the Gun. 29:45
•Carelessnesses. 46:39
•Billy Sweet. 58:25

Collaborations
 Come Find Out – Chanel sings the hook on this D'Opus & Roshambo hip-hop song (pre-tour, pre-album internet release on 9 March 2010)

References

External links
 Chanel Cole.com.au Official site
An early recording taken at Gisborne, New Zealand
Video of Chanel Cole performing in uknowit
Pictures from a pre-Idol performance

1977 births
Australian Idol participants
New Zealand musicians
New Zealand Māori musicians
People from Gisborne, New Zealand
People from Hamilton, New Zealand
People from New South Wales
Living people
Cole, Chanel
21st-century Australian singers
21st-century Australian women singers